Sputnik is a search engine owned by Rostelecom, a Russian state-owned telecommunications company. It markets itself as an engine geared towards "local services". At the end of the week of the launch, it was responsible for 0.01% of the search engine traffic in Russia, compared with 62% for Yandex and 28% for Google. It went through the maximum in February 2016, with 11 thousands hits (compared with 121 million hits of Yandex). In January 2017, Sputnik was the 15th most popular search engine in Russia, with 1 / 32,000 times the hits of Yandex. 

Despite the traction Sputnik first got during its release, the engine had two million visitors within the first week, but it was unable to compete with other search engines as time passed. In 2017, less than 1% of Russians used the engine, as they had a preference for Yandex and Google. The launch of Sputnik was deemed unsuccessful by the President of Rostelecom, Mikhail Oseevsky. In order to help bring in users, Oseevsky wanted to make Sputnik the primary search engine for government agencies and businesses, but he got little to no support for this.

Russia spent $20 million to create Sputnik. In 2015, Sputnik only brought in 136.6 million rubles in revenue. The company's lack of advertisement on the website and unpopularity took a toll on Sputnik. In 2018, Rostelecom filed Sputnik LLC for bankruptcy, the reason being the company was unable to pay its debt. The base amount of the loan taken out was 3 million rubles, but with interest acquired overtime, it was 10.6 million rubles altogether.

Rostelecom officially took down the search box from the website in 2020. The only thing that remains of the site for visitors is links to other projects created by Rostelecom.

Creation

In 2012, Prime Minister Vladimir Putin requested Rostelecom as the sole creator of e-government systems.  At the time, a technology company, KM Media, was working on a search engine already and Rostelecom bought them out.

Features

A feature that Rostelecom released on Sputnik was Stalker. This feature was released to alert users when they have come across dangerous viruses and/or malware.

Browser

There is an associated web browser, also Sputnik, derived from Chromium.

Other platforms
In early 2015, a smartphone version of Sputnik was released for smartphones and tablets and in late 2015, a version came out for PC for OS and Windows.

References

External links
 
  (browser)

C++ software
Cross-platform web browsers
Freeware
History of the Internet
Internet search engines
Rostelecom
Russian websites
Software based on WebKit
Defunct websites